Iraqi Leaders Initiative was heralded on 25 July 2006.  As enunciated by George W. Bush during his press availability  with Iraqi prime minister Nouri Maliki, "200 high school and university students from all regions of Iraq and all sectors of Iraqi society will come to America to study at local institutions and build personal friendships with the people of our country."

References

2006 in Iraq
Politics of Iraq
Iraq–United States relations